Outrageous Fortune may refer to:
Outrageous Fortune (film), a 1987 Hollywood film
Outrageous Fortune (TV series), a New Zealand drama series, produced from 2005 to 2010